The Battle of Porto Bello, or the Battle of Portobello, was a 1739 battle between a British naval force aiming to capture the settlement of Portobelo in Panama, and its Spanish defenders. It took place during the War of the Austrian Succession, in the early stages of the war sometimes known as the War of Jenkins' Ear. It resulted in a popularly acclaimed British victory.

Background
The settlement of Portobelo was an important port on the Spanish Main. Following the failure of an earlier British naval blockade to prevent a fully laden treasure fleet sailing to Spain from Porto Bello in 1727, an action in which he had taken part, then-Vice Admiral Edward Vernon repeatedly claimed he could capture it with just six ships. Following his appointment to command the Jamaica Station, Vernon organised an expedition with six ships, despite criticism that this was far too few. Vernon was a strong advocate of using small squadrons of powerfully armed warships hitting hard and moving fast rather than larger, slower-moving expeditions that were prone to heavy losses through disease.

Battle
Vernon's force appeared off Portobelo on 20 November 1739. The British ships entered the bay prepared for a general attack, but a wind coming from the east obliged Vernon to concentrate his ships on the Castillo del Hierro ("Iron Castle"), a harbour fort. The Spanish garrison was caught unprepared. When some Spaniards began to flee from several parts of the fort, several landing parties were sent inshore. The British sailors and marines scaled the walls of the fort, struck the Spanish colours in the lower battery, and hoisted an English ensign. The Spaniards surrendered then at discretion. Of the 300-man Spanish garrison, only 40 soldiers led by Lieutenant Don Juan Francisco Garganta had remained in the fort.

Once he captured Castillo del Hierro, Vernon shifted his ships against Santiago Fortress, sinking a Spanish sloop and causing other damage. At dawn on the following morning, the Spaniards requested terms. Governor Francisco Javier Martínez de la Vega y Retes surrendered in the afternoon. Portobelo was occupied by the British at the cost of three killed and seven wounded. Three prizes were taken: an armed snow which was renamed Triumph and two coastguards of 20 guns each. The British occupied the town for three weeks, destroying the fortress and other key buildings, and ending the settlement's main function as a major Spanish maritime base, before withdrawing.

Legacy

The capture of Porto Bello was welcomed as a triumph throughout Britain and America, and the name of Portobelo came to be used in commemoration at a variety of locations, such as the Portobello Road in London, the Portobello district of Edinburgh and also in Dublin; as well as Porto Bello in Virginia and Porto Bello in St. Mary's County, Maryland. The victory was particularly well received in the North-American British colonies, where the Spanish had been preying on British shipping.

Vernon became a popular hero in the wake of the victory and was promoted to the rank of admiral. He had been one of the advocates of a more belligerent approach towards Britain's enemies even prior to this expedition, and after the victory, British Prime Minister Robert Walpole was under great pressure by the Opposition to launch similar raids along the Spanish coast. Vernon's next battle in this campaign, a large-scale invasion of Cartagena in 1741, ended in  defeat.<ref>{{cite book |last=Victoria |first=Pablo |title=El día que España derrotó a Inglaterra : de cómo Blas de Lezo, tuerto, manco y cojo, venció en Cartagena de Indias a la otra "Armada Invencible" |year=2005 |publisher= Áltera |location=Barcelona |isbn=84-89779-68-6 }}</ref>

Lawrence Washington, the older brother of George Washington, served under Vernon in the Battle of Cartagena de Indias. After he inherited his family's land at Little Hunting Creek, he renamed it Mount Vernon in honor of his wartime commander. When George Washington inherited the plantation upon Lawrence's death, he kept the name.

British order of battle

 References 
 Citations 

 Sources 

 Campbell, John. Naval history of Great Britain: including the history and lives of the British admirals, Volume 4. London, Printed for Baldwyn and Co. (1818).
 
 Fernández Duro, Cesáreo. Armada española desde la unión de los reinos de Castilla y de León, tomo VI. Sucesores de Rivadeneyra, 1902.
 Beatson, Robert. Naval and military memoirs of Great Britain, from 1727 to 1783, Volume 3. London, Printed for Longman, Hurst, Rees and Orme (1804).
 Marley, David. Wars of the Americas: a chronology of armed conflict in the New World, 1492 to the present. ABC-CLIO, 1998. 
 Nester, William R. The great frontier war: Britain, France, and the imperial struggle for North America, 1607–1755. Greenwood Publishing Group, 2000. 
 Parker, Matthew. Hell's Gorge: The Battle to Build the Panama Canal. Arrow Books, 2008.
 Pearce, Edward. The Great Man. Sir Robert Walpole. Pimlico, 2008.
 Rodger, N. A. M. The Command of the Ocean: A Naval History of Britain, 1649–1815. Penguin Books, 2006.
 Simms, Brendan. Three Victories and a Defeat: The Rise and Fall of the First British Empire. Penguin Books (2008)

 External links 
 Gómez, Santiago: La Guerra de la Oreja de Jenkins. Combates en el Caribe. Antecedentes y primeros enfrentamientos. Revista de Historia Naval'' 

Battle of Porto Bello
Porto Bello
Porto Bello
Porto Bello
Porto Bello
18th century in Central America
Porto Bello
1739 in Central America
1739 in the British Empire
1739 in the Spanish Empire